New Skete may refer to:

New Skete (Mount Athos), Greece
New Skete (New York), United States